Thulusdhoo (Dhivehi: ތުލުސްދޫ) is the capital of Kaafu Atoll. 

Geography 

Demography

References

Islands of the Maldives